Darryl A. Nesbit (born 16 June 1949) is a former Australian rules footballer who played with St Kilda in the Victorian Football League (VFL).

A defender recruited from Oakleigh Districts, Nesbit made one league appearance for St Kilda, in round 21 of the 1970 VFL season, against Collingwood at Moorabbin Oval.

Nesbit coached Berwick to premierships in 1979 and 1980. He was also in charge of Cranbourne when they won three successive premierships from 1985 to 1987.

In 2008 he was named as an assistant coach in the Mornington Peninsula Nepean Football League Team of the Century.
   
Nesbit's father Des, also played for St Kilda.

References

1949 births
Australian rules footballers from Victoria (Australia)
St Kilda Football Club players
Sandringham Football Club coaches
Living people